Events in the year 1877 in Japan.

Incumbents
Emperor: Emperor Meiji
Empress consort: Empress Shōken

Governors
Aichi Prefecture: Taihe Yasujo
Akita Prefecture: Senkichi Kokushi
Aomori Prefecture: J. Hishida
Ehime Prefecture: Takatoshi Iwamura
Fukushima Prefecture: Taihe Yasujo
Gifu Prefecture: Toshi Kozaki
Gunma Prefecture: Katori Yoshihiko
Hiroshima Prefecture: Fujii Tsutomu
Ibaraki Prefecture: ..... then Baron Tatsutaro Nomura 
Iwate Prefecture: Korekiyo Shima
Kumamoto Prefecture: Takaaki Tomioka
Kochi Prefecture: Viscount Kunitake Watanabe 
Kyoto Prefecture: Baron Masanao Makimura
Mie Prefecture: Sadamedaka Iwamura
Miyagi Prefecture: Tokisuke Miyagi
Nagano Prefecture: Narasaki Hiroshi
Niigata Prefecture: Nagayama Sheng Hui
Oita Prefecture: Shinichi Kagawa 
Osaka Prefecture: Viscount Norobu Watanabe
Saitama Prefecture: Tasuke Shirane
Shimane Prefecture: Jiro Sakai
Tochigi Prefecture: Miki Nabeshima
Tokyo: Masataka Kusumoto 
Yamagata Prefecture: Viscount Mishima Michitsune

Events
January 4 - Land tax reform is implemented. 
January 29-September 24 - Satsuma Rebellion
February 19-April 12 - Siege of Kumamoto Castle
March 3–20 - Battle of Tabaruzaka
September 24 - Battle of Shiroyama

Births

Deaths
September 24 - Saigō Takamori and Kirino Toshiaki

References

 
1870s in Japan
Japan
Years of the 19th century in Japan